is a Japanese football player. She plays for AC Nagano Parceiro. She played for Japan national team.

Club career
Sakamoto was born in Tochigi Prefecture on July 7, 1992. After graduating from high school, she joined Urawa Reds in 2011. She moved to AC Nagano Parceiro in 2015.

National team career
In 2012, Sakamoto was selected Japan U-20 national team for 2012 U-20 World Cup. Japan won 3rd place. On July 30, 2017, she debuted for Japan national team against Australia.

National team statistics

References

External links

Japan Football Association

1992 births
Living people
Association football people from Tochigi Prefecture
Japanese women's footballers
Japan women's international footballers
Nadeshiko League players
Urawa Red Diamonds Ladies players
AC Nagano Parceiro Ladies players
Women's association football midfielders